The 2018–19 World Rugby Sevens Series, known for sponsorship reasons as the HSBC World Rugby Sevens Series, was the 20th annual series of rugby sevens tournaments for national men's rugby sevens teams. The Sevens Series has been run by World Rugby since 1999–2000. This series also, for the second time, doubled as a qualifier for the 2020 Summer Olympics, with the top four countries qualifying automatically.

Fiji finished first in the Series, winning five of the ten tournaments. The United States finished in a best-ever second place, reaching the semifinals in all ten tournaments. The relegation battle was a three-way competition going into the final rounds involving Japan, Kenya, and Wales, with Japan finishing last to be relegated from the Series next season. The World Series Qualifier tournament saw Ireland promoted to core status for the first time for the 2019–20 season.

Core teams

Japan was promoted to core team status for the season after winning the 2018 Hong Kong Sevens qualifier. They replaced Russia, which was relegated after finishing as the last place core team on the 2017–18 World Rugby Sevens Series.

Tour venues
The official schedule for the 2018–19 World Rugby Sevens Series was:

Standings

Official standings for the 2018–19 series:

Source: World Rugby

{| class="wikitable" style="font-size:92%;"
|-  
!colspan=2| Legend
|-
|style="width:5em;"|No colour
|Core team in 2018–19 and re-qualified as a core team for the 2019–20 World Rugby Sevens Series
|- 
|style="background:#fcc;"|Pink
|Relegated as the lowest placed core team at the end of the 2018–19 series
|- 
|style="background:#ffc;"|Yellow
|Not a core team
|-
|colspan=2 style="border-left:3px solid #06f;"| Qualified to the 2020 Olympic Sevens as one of the four highest placed eligible teams from the 2018–19 series.
|-
|}

Placings summary
Tallies of top four tournament placings during the 2018–19 series, by team:

Players

Scoring leaders

Updated: 2 June 2019

Dream Team

Impact award

Updated: 26 May 2019

Coach of the Series: Mike Friday, U.S. head coach

Tournaments

Dubai

Cape Town

Hamilton

Sydney

Las Vegas

Vancouver

Hong Kong

Singapore

London

Paris

See also

 2018–19 World Rugby Women's Sevens Series 
 Rugby sevens at the 2020 Summer Olympics – Men's qualification

References

External links
Official Site

 
World Rugby Sevens Series
World Series